Brookhaven-Lincoln County Airport  is a public use airport located three nautical miles (6 km) northeast of the central business district of Brookhaven, a city in Lincoln County, Mississippi, United States. Owned by the City of Brookhaven, it is included in the National Plan of Integrated Airport Systems for 2011–2015, which categorized it as a general aviation facility.

Facilities and aircraft 
Brookhaven-Lincoln County Airport covers an area of 146 acres (59 ha) at an elevation of 492 feet (150 m) above mean sea level. It has one runway designated 4/22 with an asphalt surface measuring 5,000 by 75 feet (1,524 x 23 m).

For the 12-month period ending June 12, 2012, the airport had 9,500 general aviation aircraft operations, an average of 26 per day. At that time there were 26 aircraft based at this airport: 62% single-engine, 19% ultralight, 15% multi-engine, and 4% helicopter.

See also 
 List of airports in Mississippi

References

External links 
 Aerial image as of February 1996 from USGS The National Map
 
 

Airports in Mississippi
Buildings and structures in Lincoln County, Mississippi
Transportation in Lincoln County, Mississippi